"Crawling Up a Hill" is the debut single by English blues rock band John Mayall & the Bluesbreakers, released in 1964. It was written by the band's founder and singer-songwriter John Mayall. A live version is included on the band's 1965 live album, John Mayall Plays John Mayall. The single was the first released recording to feature future Fleetwood Mac core member John McVie on bass.

Personnel
Single version
John Mayall - vocals, organ, harmonica
Bernie Watson - guitar
John McVie - bass
Martin Hart - drums

John Mayall Plays John Mayall live version
John Mayall - vocals, organ, harmonica
Roger Dean - guitar
John McVie - bass
Hughie Flint - drums

Katie Melua version

The song was covered by Georgian-British singer Katie Melua for her debut album, Call Off the Search (2003). It was released as a single in 2004 and peaked at number 46 in the United Kingdom and number 88 in the Netherlands.

Track listing
 "Crawling Up a Hill" 3:28
 "Crawling Up a Hill" (Live Version) 3:18
 "Jack's Room" 5:48
 "Crawling Up a Hill" (Video) 3:19

Charts

References

 John Mayall Plays John Mayall 2006 CD reissue liner notes

External links
 

1964 songs
1964 debut singles
2004 singles
Decca Records singles
Dramatico singles
Katie Melua songs
Songs written by John Mayall
British blues rock songs